The QF 4 inch Mk V gun was a Royal Navy gun of World War I which was adapted on HA (i.e. high-angle) mountings to the heavy anti-aircraft role both at sea and on land, and was also used as a coast defence gun.

Service

Naval service

This QF gun was introduced to provide a higher rate of fire than the BL 4 inch Mk VII. It first appeared in 1914 as secondary armament on s, was soon adapted to a high-angle anti-aircraft role. It was typically used on cruisers and heavier ships, although s of 1917 also mounted the gun.

Mk V was superseded by the QF 4 inch Mk XVI as the HA (i.e. anti-aircraft) gun on new warships in the 1930s, but it continued to serve on many ships such as destroyers, light and heavy cruisers in World War II.

Army anti-aircraft gun
Early in World War I several guns were supplied by the Navy for evaluation as anti-aircraft guns for the home defence of key installations in Britain. They were mounted on static platforms and proved fairly successful after a fixed round was developed to replace the original separate round, and more followed. The AA mounting allowed elevation to 80° but loading was not possible above 62°, which slowed the maximum rate of fire. At the Armistice a total of 24 guns were employed in AA defences in Britain and 2 in France. After World War I the guns were returned to the Navy.

Coast Defence gun
From 1915 to 1928 several guns were mounted in forts to guard the estuary of the River Humber.

Anti-aircraft performance

Ammunition
Ammunition for the original low-angle guns introduced in World War I was Separate QF i.e. the shell and cartridge were separate items, but in World War II most guns used Fixed QF ammunition i.e. a single unit.  The fixed Mk V ammunition was 44.3 inches (1.13 m) long and weighed 56 pounds (25 kg), while the projectile was 31 pounds (14 kg).

See also
List of anti-aircraft guns
List of naval guns
List of naval anti-aircraft guns

Weapons of comparable role, performance and era
Cannon 102/45 Italian copy of the QF Mk V made under license
10.5 cm SK L/45 naval gun Approximate German equivalent firing slightly heavier shell

Surviving examples
 A gun from HMNZS Tutira in front of the Devonport Naval Base, Auckland, New Zealand

Notes

References

Bibliography
Tony DiGiulian, British 4"/45 (10.2 cm) QF Mark V and Mark XV
I.V. Hogg & L.F. Thurston, British Artillery Weapons & Ammunition 1914–1918. London: Ian Allan, 1972.
Brigadier N.W. Routledge, History of the Royal Regiment of Artillery. Anti-Aircraft Artillery, 1914–55. London: Brassey's, 1994.

External links

 Gun drill for 4-inch Q.F. gun mark V (land Service) 1924 at State Library of Victoria

Naval guns of the United Kingdom
Naval anti-aircraft guns
World War I anti-aircraft guns
Artillery of the United Kingdom
Coastal artillery
100 mm artillery
World War I naval weapons of the United Kingdom
World War II naval weapons of the United Kingdom